Colne Valley was an urban district in the West Riding of Yorkshire, England between 1937 and 1974. It takes its name from the River Colne which rises above the town of Marsden and flows eastward towards Huddersfield.

Colne Valley Urban District was formed on 1 April 1937 following the abolition of many of the urban districts and reallocation of land surrounding Huddersfield and comprised the following former urban district areas: 

 of Golcar Urban District — population 7,875
 of Linthwaite Urban District — population 5,220
Marsden Urban District — , population 5,723
Scammonden Urban District — , population 394
Slaithwaite Urban District — , population 5,183

Colne Valley UD was abolished under the Local Government Act 1972, becoming part of the Metropolitan Borough of Kirklees on 1 April 1974. No successor parish was created for the area, but its boundaries remain reflected in a ward of the same name on Kirklees Council.

References

Districts of England abolished by the Local Government Act 1972
History of Yorkshire
Local government in West Yorkshire
Urban districts of England